Sam Gerber (born 5 February 1981 in Uitenhage) is a South African rugby union winger, currently playing for the Top 14 club Aviron Bayonnais, having previously only played for the Pumas, with whom he participated in the Currie Cup in 2005 and 2006. He was the top try scorer during the 2009–10 Top 14 season.

References

1981 births
Living people
People from Uitenhage
South African rugby union players
Rugby union wings
Rugby union players from the Eastern Cape
Pumas (Currie Cup) players